Acrocercops galeopa is a moth of the family Gracillariidae, known from Assam, Meghalaya India. It was described by Edward Meyrick in 1908.

References

galeopa
Moths of Asia
Moths described in 1908